In Aztec mythology, Centeōtl  (also known as Centeocihuatl or Cinteotl) is the maize deity. Cintli  means "dried maize still on the cob" and teōtl  means "deity". According to the Florentine Codex, Centeotl is the son of the earth goddess, Tlazolteotl and solar deity Piltzintecuhtli, the planet Mercury. He was born on the day-sign 1 Xochitl. Another myth claims him as the son of the goddess Xochiquetzal.  The majority of evidence gathered on Centeotl suggests that he is usually portrayed as a young man (although a debate is still ongoing), with yellow body colouration. Some specialists believe that Centeotl used to be the maize goddess Chicomecōātl. Centeotl was considered one of the most important deities of the Aztec era. There are many common features that are shown in depictions of Centeotl. For example, there often seems to be maize in his headdress. Another striking trait is the black line passing down his eyebrow, through his cheek and finishing at the bottom of his jaw line. These face markings are similarly and frequently used in the late post-classic depictions of the 'foliated' Maya maize god.

Controversy 
According to sources, Cinteotl is the god of maize and subsistence and Centeotl corresponds to Chicomecoatl, the goddess of agriculture.

Worship 
In the Tonalpohualli (a 260-day sacred calendar used by many ancient Mesoamerican cultures), Centeotl is the Lord of the Day for days with number seven and he is the fourth Lord of the Night. In Aztec mythology, maize (which was called Cintli in Nahuatl, the Aztec spoken language) was brought to this world by Quetzalcoatl and it is associated with the group of stars known commonly today as the Pleiades.

At the beginning of the year (most likely around February), Aztec workers would plant the young maize. These young maize plants potentially were used as symbolism for a pretty goddess, most likely Chicomecōātl, Princess of the Unripe Maize. Chicomecōātl is usually depicted carrying fresh maize in her hands, bare-breasted, and sitting down in a modest manner. An interesting conflict exists in that some historians believe Chicomecōātl, otherwise known as 'the hairy one' and Centeotl are the same deity. When the seeds were planted, a ritual dance occurred in order to thank Mother Earth and more specifically Centeotl. These dances became increasingly more prominent as the warmth of the sun brought about great prosperity for the Aztecs in the form of sprouting maize canes. This festival has been compared to the more Western maypole festival due to the similarity of their celebrations (dancing for spring, feasting, etc.). These festivals were probably very pleasant for the Aztecs, judged by similar festivals in other civilizations. A major custom in Mexico during this festival period was for female Aztecs, regardless of marital status to loosen their ponchos and let down their hair. They would proceed to dance bare-breasted in the maize fields in order to thank Centeotl for his work. Then each female would pick five ears of corn from the field and bring it back in a grand procession while singing and dancing. Women in these processions were the promises of food and life in the Aztec world. Traditionally, massive fights would break out as people tried to soak one another in flower pollen or scented maize flour. Also, flower petals were thrown in ceremonial fashion over people who were carrying the ears of corn.

Corn was rather essential to Aztec life and thus the importance of Centeotl cannot be overlooked. It can be seen from countless historical sources that a lot of the maize that was cultivated by the Aztecs was used in sacrifices to gods. Usually, at least five newly ripened maize cobs were picked by the older Aztec women. These were then carried on the female's backs after being carefully wrapped up, somewhat like a mother would wrap up a newborn child. Once the cobs reached their destination, usually outside a house, they were placed in a special corn basket and would stay there until the following year. This was meant to represent the resting of the maize spirits until the next harvesting period came around.

These five cobs were also symbols for a seemingly separate goddess. This highly worshipped goddess was known as Lady Chicomecoatl, Seven Serpents. She was the earth spirit and the lady of fertility and life, seen as a kind of mother figure in the Aztec world and was the partner of Centeotl.

Gallery

See also 
 Maya maize god
 Chicomecōātl (Aztec goddess of maize)

References

External links 
 

Aztec gods
Agricultural gods
Food deities